Patrik Koyš (born October 24, 1995) is a Slovak ice hockey player who is currently playing for the HC Topoľčany in the Slovak Tipsport Liga.

International play

After playing for Slovakia at the U18 and U20 levels. In 2015, he guided Slovakia's U20 team to a bronze medal at the 2015 World Junior Championships.

References

External links

1995 births
Living people
HK Dukla Trenčín players
HC Košice players
MHC Martin players
MHk 32 Liptovský Mikuláš players
People from Ilava
Sportspeople from the Trenčín Region
HK Poprad players
Shawinigan Cataractes players
Slovak ice hockey left wingers
Slovak expatriate ice hockey players in Canada